This is a list of Nigerian scientists and scholars. Nigeria is
a federal constitutional republic comprising 36 states and its Federal Capital Territory, Abuja. The country is located in West Africa.

A
Iya Abubakar - mathematician
Akin Abayomi - pathologist
Babatunde Kwaku Adadevoh - chemical pathologist
Ladipo Adamolekun - public administrator
Anthony Afolabi Adegbola - animal scientist
Maggie Aderin-Pocock - space scientist
Ilesanmi Adesida - physicist
Olanike Adeyemo - veterinary medicine and preventive medicine
Isaac Folorunso Adewole - gynaecologist
Chimamanda Ngozi Adichie - writer
Ernest Afiesimama - climate scientist and environmentalist
Adiele Afigbo - historian
Joseph Ahaneku - chemical pathologist
Lenrie Olatokunbo Aina - library and information scientist
Deborah Ajakaiye - geophysicist
Jacob Ade Ajayi - historian
Seth Sunday Ajayi - wildlife ecologist
Oladele Ajose - public health
Esther Titilayo Akinlabi - mechanical engineer
Dora Akunyili - pharmacist
Grace Alele-Williams - mathematician
Ambrose Folorunsho Alli - pathologist
Olajide Aluko - international relations
Uche Veronica Amazigo - biologist and parasitologist
El Anatsui - sculpture
Alexander Animalu - physicist
Anya Oko Anya - parasitologist
Ishaya Audu - pediatrician
Eme Awa - political scientist
Ayodele Awojobi - mechanical engineer

B
Olumbe Bassir - biochemistry and microbiology
Ekanem Ikpi Braide - parasitologist

D
John Dabiri - aeronautical engineering and biophysics
Bello Bako Dambatta - chemist
Kenneth Dike - historian
Ikechukwu Dozie - public health scientist

E
Michael Echeruo - literature
Philip Emeagwali - mathematician and engineer
Emmanuel Emovon - chemist
Charles Esimone - pharmacist
Emmanuel Chukwudi Eze - philosopher
Chinwe Nwogo Ezeani - librarian

F
Babs Fafunwa - educationist
Toyin Falola - historian
Adeyinka Gladys Falusi - haematologist
Oluwole Babafemi Familoni - chemist

G
Ibrahim Gambari - political scientist
Adenike Grange - medicine
Oye Gureje - psychiatry
Albert Ilemobade - veterinarian
Maurice Iwu - pharmacist

I
Oni Emmanuel Idigbe - medical researcher

K
Kalu Ndukwe Kalu - political scientist

L
Abisogun Leigh - Animal Scientist

M
Akin Mabogunje - geographer
Emmanuel Ndubisi Maduagwu - biochemist
Awele Maduemezia - physicist
Oliver Mobisson - computer scientist
Fatima Batul Mukhtar - botanist

N
Chinedu Ositadinma Nebo -  engineer
Eni Njoku - botanist
Bartholomew Nnaji - mechanical and industrial engineering
Andrew Jonathan Nok - biochemist
Eucharia Oluchi Nwaichi - environmental biochemist
Humphrey Nwosu - political scientist

O
John Obafunwa - pathologist
Oyewusi Ibidapo Obe - systems engineer
Chike Obi - mathematician
Abiola Odejide - linguist
Latunde Odeku - neurosurgeon
Josephat Obi Oguejiofor - philosopher
Gabriel Babatunde Ogunmola - chemist
Adetoun Ogunsheye - library scientist
Ayo Ogunsheye - adult education
Francisca Nneka Okeke - physicist
Friday Okonofua - gynaecologist
Samuel Okoye - astrophysicist
Isidore Okpewho - novelist and critic
Ben Okri - writer
Ifedayo Oladapo - civil engineer
Ibiyemi Olatunji-Bello - physiologist
Abel Idowu Olayinka - geophysicist
Olufunmilayo Olopade - oncologist
Is-haq Oloyede - Islamic Studies
Kunle Olukotun - electrical engineering and computer scientist
Hezekiah Ademola Oluwafemi - agricultural economist
Sophie Oluwole - philosopher
Bennet Omalu - forensic pathologist
Akinyinka Omigbodun - gynaecologist
Michael Omolewa - educationist
Peter Onumanyi - mathematician
Kalu Mosto Onuoha - geophysicist
Obinna Onwujekwe - health economist
Viola Onwuliri - biochemist
Cyril Agodi Onwumechili - nuclear physicist
Femi Osofisan - writer
Niyi Osundare - literature
Benjamin Oluwakayode Osuntokun - neurologist
Victor Adenuga Oyenuga - agriculturist
Yemi Osinbajo - lawyer
Nelson Oyesiku -neurosurgeon and endocrinologist

P
Babalola Chinedum Peace - pharmacist

R
Olikoye Ransome-Kuti - paediatrician
Ola Rotimi - playwright

S
Omowunmi Sadik - chemist
Lateef Akinola Salako - pharmacologist
Arinola Olasumbo Sanya - physiotherapy
Winston Wole Soboyejo - mechanical and aerospace engineering
John Olubi Sodipo - philosopher
Olusoga Sofola - physiologist
Zulu Sofola - playwright and dramatist
Olaitan Soyannwo - anesthesia
Margaret Adebisi Sowunmi - botanist and environmental archaeologist

T
Grace Oladunni Taylor - biochemist
Oyewale Tomori - virologist
Tekena Tamuno - historian

U
Fabian Udekwu - cardiac surgeon
Chinyere Ukaga - environmental biologist and parasitologist
Ibrahim H. Umar - physicist
Jarlath Udoudo Umoh - veterinary doctor
Patrick Utomi - political economist

W
Eka Esu Williams - immunologist

Z
Babagana Umara Zulum - Soil and Water Engineer

References

Scientists and scholars
Nigerian